Johns River is a locality in the Mid-Coast Council of New South Wales.
 
Johns River is approximately 275 km from the state capital, Sydney. At the 2016 census it had a population of 322.

Geography

Johns River is bounded to the north by Middle Brother National Park and Crowdy Bay National Park to the East.
The rural locality of Stewarts River, New South Wales is to the west and the Pacific Ocean to the east. The dominant land features of Johns River include Middle Brother and South Brother hills. Johns River is ironically located on Stewarts River which feeds into Watson Taylors Lake.

The Pacific Highway and North Coast railway line both pass through Johns River.
The locality contains a small village with a family friendly tavern and a small private airfield.

References

Mid North Coast
Towns in New South Wales